Fred & Eric is a British multidisciplinary creative agency based in London, specialising in animation, illustration and design with an emphasis on mixing traditional craft with modern animation techniques.

The company was founded in March 2011 by former Mr & Mrs Smith Design Ltd employees Jamie Pigram (Head of Production), Sarah Killeen (Managing Director) & Maggie Rogers (Creative Director).

Upon launching, Fred & Eric's branding focused on the ampersand in their logo, using it to show their eagerness for collaboration by inviting other creatives to submit their own ampersands to the Fred & Eric blog every month, regularly reinterpreting the brand marque by doing so.

Since their launch Fred & Eric have received positive press support, appearing on The Campaign Live Website,  design blog FormFiftyFive, The Metro newspaper  and creative blog, It's Nice That.

In April 2011 one of Fred & Eric's handmade Ampersand Designs appeared on the cover of Design Week Magazine  alongside an article profiling the company.

In 2018 Fred & Eric  embarked on a major rebrand, revisualising their logo and website to create a brand-new showcase for their impressive portfolio of animations.

References

External links 
 Fred & Eric's Website

Further reading
 FormFiftyFive
 Maggie Rogers

British animation studios
Graphic design studios
Crafts
2011 establishments in the United Kingdom